KMIS (1050 AM, "Sports Radio 1050") is an American radio station licensed to serve the community of Portageville, Missouri.  The station's broadcast license is held by Pollack Broadcasting Company.

KMIS operates as a daytime-only broadcaster to prevent skywave interference with clear-channel stations WEPN in New York City, KTCT in San Mateo, California, and XEG-AM in Guadalupe, Nuevo León, Mexico. The station broadcasts a sports format branded "Sports Radio 1050" as an affiliate of Fox Sports Radio. Syndicated programming includes The Dan Patrick Show and The Jim Rome Show from Premiere Networks.

The station was assigned the call sign "KMIS" by the Federal Communications Commission (FCC).

Sports Radio 1050 is simulcast on sister station 103.9 FM KMIS-FM.

References

External links
KMIS official website

 

MIS
Sports radio stations in the United States
Radio stations established in 1960
New Madrid County, Missouri
MIS (AM)